The Harvard National Model United Nations - Latin America (HNMUN-LA) is an annual traveling Model United Nations conference that is run by the Harvard International Relations Council and a local team from a host city. HNMUN-LA is the regional edition of Harvard National Model United Nations, considered the most prestigious MUN conference in the world. Its first edition was held in 2012 in Buenos Aires, Argentina; it has been held four times in Lima, Peru.

The Conference targets college students from all over the world (specially from the Latin America region) who have a passion and interest to become a diplomat in future. Recently, high school students have been given the chance to participate in the conference with a small number of committees destined for them.

General information and history

Born as a regional edition of HNMUN, the "Super Bowl of MUN", HNMUN-LA uses a competitive bidding process to select locations for each conference, with prospective host teams, usually consisting of the MUN societies of large universities, applying.

The conference is generally held in January.

HNMUN-LA uses the American style of Model United Nations, with almost all delegates paired with another from their delegation, with discussions occurring both inside and outside the rooms simultaneously.

Committees in the past have included United Nations General Assembly committees, Economic and Social Council organisms, regional bodies (such as the Organization of American States), usually one crisis committee alongside a United Nations Security Council, and the Third Party Actors Committee.

As most other conferences, there are also workshops, social events showcasing local culture and a global village, where participant teams can share delicacies and traditions from their home countries.

The most successful team at HNMUN-LA to date is Peruvian Debate Society, having achieved the Best Large Delegation Award in four out of five consecutive participations, adding one Outstanding Large Delegation Award. Venezuelan MUN Society is the second most successful team, having attained four Best Small Delegation Awards consecutively, one Best Large Delegation award and two more consecutive Best Small Delegation Awards. Peruvian Universities has garnered three Outstanding Large Delegation Awards and one Best Large Delegation award, being the third most successful team in the history of the conference.

HNMUN-LA Conferences

See also
Model United Nations
Harvard National Model United Nations
Harvard World Model United Nations

References

External links
Official HNMUN-LA website

Model United Nations